Jeanne Lion, or Jeanne Léonnec, (17 August 1876 – 24 December 1956) was a French stage and film actress.

Filmography 
 1926 : Jim la houlette, roi des voleurs as the servant
 1933 : Pas besoin d'argent
 1934 : La Flambée
 1934 : Jeanne as Mme Savignoll
 1934 : Le Monde où l'on s'ennuie
 1936 : Le cœur dispose
 1936 : La Peur
 1936 : Wells in Flames as Mme Yvolandi
 1937 : Maman Colibri
 1938 : Le Ruisseau
 1938 : Mother Love as Mathilde
 1938 : Vidocq
 1940 : Nightclub Hostess as aunt Louise
 1948 : L'Ombre  as the teinturière 1948 : Eternal Conflict as Mémé
 1949 : Monseigneur as Mme de Ponthieux
 1951 : Le Vrai Coupable Theatre 

 1904 : King Lear by William Shakespeare, directed by André Antoine, Théâtre Antoine
 1905 : Vers l'amour by Léon Gandillot, directed by André Antoine, Théâtre Antoine
 1906 : Hop o'my thumb by Richard Pryce and Frederick Fenn, directed by André Antoine, Théâtre Antoine
 1908 : L'Alibi by Gabriel Trarieux, Théâtre de l'Odéon
 1909 : Les Grands by Pierre Veber and Serge Basset, Théâtre de l'Odéon
 1914 : La Victime by Fernand Vanderem and Franc-Nohain, Comédie des Champs-Élysées
 1916 : L'Amazone by Henry Bataille, Théâtre de la Porte-Saint-Martin
 1925 : La Chapelle ardente by Gabriel Marcel, directed by Gaston Baty, Théâtre du Vieux-Colombier
 1934 : Les Temps difficiles by Édouard Bourdet, Théâtre de la Michodière
 1935 : Rouge ! by Henri Duvernois, Théâtre Saint-Georges
 1936 : Christian by Yvan Noé, Théâtre des Variétés
 1937 : Victoria Regina by Laurence Housman, directed by André Brulé, Théâtre de la Madeleine
 1938 : Frénésie by Charles de Peyret-Chappuis, directed by Charles de Rochefort, Théâtre Charles de Rochefort
 1939 : Roi de France by Maurice Rostand, directed by Harry Baur, Théâtre de l'Œuvre
 1946 : Divines Paroles by Ramón María del Valle-Inclán, directed by Marcel Herrand, Théâtre des Mathurins
 1946 : And Then There Were None by Agatha Christie, directed by Roland Piétri, Théâtre Antoine
 1947 : Passage du malin by François Mauriac, directed by Jean Meyer, Théâtre de la Madeleine
 1948 : Marqué défendu by Marcel Rosset, directed by Charlie Gerval, Théâtre des Célestins
 1949 : Une femme libre by Armand Salacrou, directed by Jacques Dumesnil, with Jacques Dumesnil, Yves Robert, Théâtre Saint-Georges
 1950 : Une femme libre by Armand Salacrou, directed by Jacques Dumesnil, Théâtre des Célestins, tournée
 1950 : Pourquoi pas moi by Armand Salacrou, directed by Jacques Dumesnil, Théâtre Édouard VII
 1951 : Les Fourberies de Scapin by Molière, directed by Louis Jouvet, Théâtre des Célestins
 1951 : L'Épreuve by Marivaux, directed by Pierre Bertin, Théâtre des Célestins
 1952 : Feu Monsieur de Marcy'' by Raymond Vincy and Max Régnier, directed by Georges Douking, Théâtre de la Porte Saint-Martin

References

External links 
 

French stage actresses
French film actresses
Actresses from Paris
1876 births
1969 deaths